Alexander Nikolayevich Pypin (6 April 1833 – 9 December 1904) was a Russian literary historian, ethnographer, journalist and editor; a member of the Russian Academy of Sciences and (briefly, in 1904), its vice-president. Nikolai Chernyshevsky was his cousin on the maternal side.

Pypin actively contributed to Sovremennik (which he edited in 1863–1866), Vestnik Evropy, and Otechestvennye Zapiski. Among his most acclaimed works are the History of Slavic Literatures (Vols. 1–2, 1879–1881, with Vladimir Spasovich), the History of Russian Ethnography (Vols. 1890–1892) and the History of Russian Literature (Vols. 1–4, 1911–1913, posthumously).

References 

Russian literary historians
Ethnographers from the Russian Empire
Writers from Saratov
1802 births
1880 deaths
Full Members of the Russian Academy of Sciences
Journalists from the Russian Empire
Russian male journalists
Male writers from the Russian Empire
Editors from the Russian Empire